In music, Op. 11 stands for Opus number 11. Compositions that are assigned this number include:
 Barber – Adagio for Strings
 Barber – String Quartet
 Beethoven – Piano Trio, Op. 11
 Boccherini – String Quintet in E major, Op. 11, No. 5
 Brahms – Serenade No. 1
 Chopin – Piano Concerto No. 1
 Dvořák – Romance in F minor
 Elgar – Sursum corda
 Enescu – Romanian Rhapsodies
 Fanny Mendelssohn – Piano Trio
 Gottschalk – Le Mancenillier
 Granados – Goyescas
 Grieg – In Autumn
 Hindemith – Viola Sonata No. 1
 Hindemith – Violin Sonata No. 2
 Karłowicz – Lithuanian Rhapsody
 Mendelssohn – Symphony No. 1
 Prokofiev – Toccata
 Racine – Cantique de Jean Racine
 Schoenberg – Drei Klavierstücke
 Schumann – Piano Sonata No. 1
 Scriabin – 24 Preludes, Op. 11
 Sibelius – Karelia Suite
 Siegfried Wagner – An allem ist Hütchen schuld!
 Spohr – String Quartet No. 3
 Stamitz – Symphony in E-flat major, Op. 11, No. 3
 Stanford – Violin Sonata No. 1
 Strauss – Horn Concerto No. 1
 Tchaikovsky – String Quartet No. 1
 Vivaldi – Six Concertos, Op. 11
 Zemlinsky – Der Traumgörge